Aram may refer to:

Arts and entertainment
 Aram (film), 2002 French action drama
 Aram, a fictional character in  Japanese manga series MeruPuri
 Aram Quartet, an Italian music group 
 Aram (Kural book), the first of the three books of the Kural literature

People
 Aram (given name), including a list of people with the name
 Aram (surname), including a list of people with the surname
 Aram, son of Shem, a biblical character
 Aram, from whom the name of Armenia may derive
 Aram I (born 1947), catholicos of the Armenian Apostolic Church
 Aram (actress) (Azam Mirhabibi, born 1953), Iranian film actress
 Ram (biblical figure), or Aram in the New Testament

Places
Aram (region), or Aramea, an ancient region, located in modern Syria
Åram, Norway
Aram, Iran
Aram, Mazandaran, Iran
Aram Street, a street in Yerevan, Armenia

Other uses
 Aram, the third day of the month in the Armenian calendar
 ARAM Periodical, an academic journal
 Associate of the Royal Academy of Music
 "All Random, All Mid", a game mode in League of Legends

See also 

Aramaean (disambiguation)
Aramaic (disambiguation)
Eugene Aram (disambiguation)
Aram's New Ground, a former cricket ground in Walworth, England
Aram Chaos, an impact crater on Mars
Aramm, a 2017 Tamil-language film
 Iram of the Pillars, a lost city, region or tribe mentioned in the Quran